Central Linn High School is a public high school in Halsey, Oregon, United States.

Academics
In 2008, 75% of the school's seniors received a high school diploma. Of 56 students, 42 graduated, eight dropped out, three received a modified diploma, and three were still in high school the following year.

As of the 2015–2016 school year, the whole school is on self-paced math, through a "math lab" setting. Students move at their own pace, and don't move on until they know the material. This makes sure learners aren't just being pushed through the system. A similar setup can be seen in the high school levels with the humanities. 

Central Linn is on a four-day week, but on Fridays, students have the option to come in, work on unfinished work, and get direct feedback. "Friday School" lasts half a day, and nearly half the school attends. Many prefer this setup over a five-day week.

Students are graded on a 4-point system, where 3 is a passing score (the equivalent of a "C"), and a 4 is exceeding ("A"). Learners can correct mistakes, and mistakes are not held against them on the final grade.

Sports
In the 2009–2010 season the boys' basketball team made it to the state tournament and took second place to Portland Christian. In the following season they returned to the same tournament and took second once again, this time to Western Mennonite, whom they had previously beaten twice in league play. In the 2010–2011 season Zachary Holloway set a record of points scored by a single player in the tournament, with 36 points.

The high school boys' track team has won twelve 1A/2A state championships (1967, 1969, 1970, 1971, 1978, 1983, 1987, 2011, 2012, 2013, 2014, and 2015).

The girls basketball team has been to the state playoffs 3 consecutive years (2017/18, 18/19, 19/20) finishing 4th in 18/19, and 6th in 19/20.

The Central Linn gym had an elaborate painting done in late 2010 by foreign exchange student Mathias Peter Hansen. The painting depicted a cobra about 20 feet in height, with a blue background, and the words "Cobra" and "Dome" on either side of the snake. This reflected the unofficial title of the gym, "Cobra Dome", due to its high arched ceiling.

References

High schools in Linn County, Oregon
Public high schools in Oregon
Public middle schools in Oregon